The 1930 All-Pacific Coast football team consists of American football players chosen by various organizations for All-Pacific Coast teams for the 1930 college football season. The organizations selecting teams in 1934 included the Associated Press (AP), the Newspaper Enterprise Association, and the United Press (UP).

All-Pacific Coast selections

Quarterback
 Marshall Duffield, USC (AP-1; NEA-1; UP-1)

Halfbacks
 Erny Pinckert, USC (AP-1; UP-1) (College Football Hall of Fame)
 Johnny Kitzmiller, Oregon (AP-1; NEA-1; UP-1) (College Football Hall of Fame)

Fullback
 Elmer Schwartz, Washington State (AP-1; NEA-1; UP-1)

Ends
 Garrett Arbelbide, USC (AP-1;NEA-1; UP-1)
 Harry Ebding, St. Mary's (AP-1; UP-1)
 Bill McKalip, Oregon State (NEA-1)

Tackles
 Glen Edwards, Washington State (AP-1; NEA-1; UP-1)
 Paul Schwegler, Washington (AP-1; NEA-1; UP-1) (College Football Hall of Fame)

Guards
 Johnny Baker, USC (AP-1; NEA-1; UP-1) (College Football Hall of Fame)
 Ted Beckett, California (AP-1; NEA-1; UP-1)

Centers
 Mel Hein, Washington State (AP-1; NEA-1; UP-1) (College and Pro Football Halls of Fame)

Key

AP = Associated Press, selected "after the most comprehensive balloting ever taken on a mythical eleven in the Far West"

NEA = Newspaper Enterprise Association, "selected by NEA newspaper sports writers all over the Pacific conference territory"

UP = United Press, "picked by sports editors and writers on metropolitan newspapers from every section represented by contending talent"

Bold = Consensus first-team selection by at least two of the AP, NEA and UP

See also
1930 College Football All-America Team

References

All-Pacific Coast Football Team
All-Pacific Coast football teams
All-Pac-12 Conference football teams